Trinidad and Tobago national field hockey team may refer to:
 Trinidad and Tobago men's national field hockey team
 Trinidad and Tobago women's national field hockey team